The 1925 Providence College football team was an American football team that represented Providence College during the 1925 college football season. Led by first-year head coach Archie Golembeski, the team compiled a 2–7 record and was outscored by a total of 197 to 53.

Schedule

References

Providence
Providence Friars football seasons
Providence College football